The 2013 Southeastern Louisiana Lions football team represented Southeastern Louisiana University in the 2013 NCAA Division I FCS football season. The Lions were led by second-year head coach Ron Roberts and played their home games at Strawberry Stadium. They were a member of the Southland Conference. They finished the season 11–3, 7–0 in Southland play to win the Southland Conference championship. They received the conference's automatic bid to the FCS Playoffs where they defeated fellow Southland member Sam Houston State in the second round before losing in the quarterfinals to New Hampshire.

Media
All Lions games can be heard on KSLU 90.9 FM and online at LionSports.net. Conference home games not shown by another source will be done by Southeastern Channel, the student production group. All games are shown tape delayed on Southeastern Channel Thursday at 8 PM, Friday at 3 PM, Saturday at 8 AM, and Sunday at 1 PM.

Roster

Schedule

^Games aired on a Tape Delayed Basis.

Game Summaries

Southeast Missouri State

Sources:

TCU

Sources:

South Dakota State

Sources:

Samford

Sources:

Incarnate Word

Sources:

Stephen F. Austin

Sources:

Northwestern State

Sources:

Lamar

Sources:

McNeese State

Sources:

Central Arkansas

Sources:

Sam Houston State

Sources:

Nicholls State

Sources:

Ranking movements

References

Southeastern Louisiana
Southeastern Louisiana Lions football seasons
Southland Conference football champion seasons
Southeastern Louisiana
Southeastern Louisiana Lions football